Jeremy Hawkins (born 15 May 1993) is a New Zealand professional rugby league footballer who currently plays for Redcliffe Dolphins in the Queensland Cup.

Background
Born in Wellington, New Zealand, Hawkins played rugby union until he was 14-years-old. He then made the switch to rugby league with the Randwick Kingfishers, before being signed by the Canberra Raiders.

Playing career

Early career
From 2011 to 2013, Hawkins played for the Canberra Raiders' NYC team. On 30 August 2013, he re-signed with the Raiders on a 2-year contract. On 13 October 2013, he vice-captained the Junior Kiwis against the Junior Kangaroos, after being 18th man the year before.

2014
In 2014, Hawkins graduated to the Raiders' New South Wales Cup team, Mount Pritchard Mounties. In round 18 of the 2014 NRL season, he was named to make his NRL debut against the Gold Coast Titans, however the Raiders' request to play him was denied by the NRL due to Canberra having used up all their second-tier salary cap and having players in Hawkin's position available to play. In round 24, he made his NRL debut for Canberra against the Cronulla-Sutherland Sharks, playing at centre in the club's 22-12 win at Remondis Stadium.

2015
On 13 February, Hawkins re-signed with Canberra on a two-year contract, however, on 5 November, he was released from the final two years of his contract and signed a two-year contract with the Melbourne Storm starting in 2016.

2016-2019
Hawkins never played a first grade game for Melbourne.  He instead featured for the club's feeder sides in the Queensland Cup.  In 2018, he joined the Redcliffe Dolphins.

References

External links
2015 Canberra Raiders profile

1993 births
Living people
New Zealand rugby league players
New Zealand Māori rugby league players
Canberra Raiders players
Junior Kiwis players
Randwick Kingfishers players
Mount Pritchard Mounties players
Rugby league centres
Rugby league players from Wellington City
Rugby league wingers
Sunshine Coast Falcons players